The 2018 Open de Rennes was a professional tennis tournament played on hard courts. It was the twelfth edition of the tournament and part of the 2018 ATP Challenger Tour. It took place in Rennes, France between 22 and 28 January 2018.

Singles main-draw entrants

Seeds

1 Rankings are as of 15 January 2018.

Other entrants
The following players received wildcards into the singles main draw:
  Manuel Guinard
  Ernests Gulbis
  Ugo Humbert
  Maxime Janvier

The following player received entry into the singles main draw as a special exempt:
  Mats Moraing

The following player received entry into the singles main draw as an alternate:
  Ričardas Berankis

The following players received entry from the qualifying draw:
  Antoine Hoang
  Tristan Lamasine
  Yasutaka Uchiyama
  Mikael Ymer

Champions

Singles

 Vasek Pospisil def.  Ričardas Berankis 6–1, 6–2.

Doubles

 Sander Gillé /  Joran Vliegen def.  Sander Arends /  Antonio Šančić 6–3, 6–7(1–7), [10–7].

External links
Official Website

2018
2018 ATP Challenger Tour
2018 in French tennis
January 2018 sports events in France